Daisy May Cooper (born 1 August 1986) is an English actress and writer. She won the 2018 BAFTA TV Award for Best Female Comedy Performance for playing Kerry Mucklowe in the BBC Three series This Country, which she co-created and co-wrote with her younger brother, Charlie Cooper.

Early life and education
Cooper was born in Cirencester, Gloucestershire, in 1986 and is the elder of two children. Her brother, Charlie Cooper, is also an actor and writer. She attended Cirencester Deer Park School, followed by drama school at the Royal Academy of Dramatic Art in London.

Career
After one role as a young mother in ITV series Doc Martin she returned to the West Country, working as a cleaner with her brother Charlie.  For a while the siblings lived together – their experiences would later form part of the writings for This Country.

In 2014, she landed the role of PC Garvey in the TV series The Wrong Mans.  In the same year, a pilot based on the Coopers' initial series pitch had been shot for ITV as the (never released) film Kerry, setting the basis for This Country.

She wrote and starred with her brother, Charlie, in the BBC Three comedy series This Country, for which she won a TV BAFTA award for Best Female Comedy Performance in 2018. Due to the success of the first series of This Country, a second series was commissioned and aired on BBC Three in February 2018. A third series aired in 2020.

In 2019, she played Peggotty in The Personal History of David Copperfield and in 2020, she had a part in Armando Iannucci's HBO space comedy Avenue 5. She also appeared with her father, Paul, on Celebrity Gogglebox. On 29 July 2020, Cooper took part in the tenth series of Taskmaster. In 2022 she played one of the two lead characters in the television sitcom The Witchfinder. 

In 2023, she participated as "Otter" on the fourth series of The Masked Singer.

Personal life
Cooper married her long-term partner, Will Weston, on 21 September 2019. The couple have two children, a daughter, Pip and a son born in October 2020, named Jack Michael Weston, in honour of her late friend and This Country co-star, Michael Sleggs, who played the dull friend of Kurtan and Kerry, Michael ‘Slugs’ Slugett. Michael Sleggs died in 2019, age 33, after battling terminal cancer. In July 2021, it was reported that Cooper had separated from her husband, 10 months after the birth of her son.

Filmography

References

External links 
 

1986 births
Living people
Actresses from Gloucestershire
English television actresses
Best Female Comedy Performance BAFTA Award (television) winners
People from Cirencester
WFTV Award winners
21st-century English actresses
Alumni of RADA